CAMILLA AND MARC is an Australian women's fashion label launched in 2003 at Australian Fashion Week by Sydney-based brother and sister Camilla Freeman-Topper and Marc Freeman. Its style has been described as masculine tailoring with feminine silhouettes. Vogue Australia defined the brand hallmarks as a combination of luxurious fabrics, colourful prints and eccentric details.

History
Camilla Freeman-Topper (born 1981) studied fashion at Whitehouse Institute of Design, Sydney, before winning a scholarship and spending a further year training at Accademia italiana in Florence, Italy. Marc Freeman (born 1979) trained in engineering and a masters of commerce at UNSW before they started the brand together. Freeman manages the brand and business, while Freeman-Topper focuses on design.

Expansion
In 2007, CAMILLA AND MARC launched a swimwear range, known as C&M CAMILLA AND MARC SWIM. Two years later, its first store opened in the Paddington suburb of Sydney, followed by a further store in Melbourne and an e-commerce site.
In August 2012, the brand launched a C&M CAMILLA AND MARC off duty line. Designed as a 'little sister' to the main brand, it included a full range at a lower price, including denim and swimwear, designed to appeal to a younger audience.

In 2013, the label's 10th anniversary, CAMILLA AND MARC was chosen to open the show at Mercedes-Benz Fashion Week Australia. In 2014, a second Sydney store at Five Ways opened, enabling the first Sydney store to focus on retailing the diffusion line. A footwear line was announced for launch in late 2014.

In 2018, the brand was the first shown again at the Mercedes-Benz Fashion Week.

CAMILLA AND MARC expansion plans in Australia continue with 5 stores opening across the country over the past few years – and with three more boutiques set to open by end of 2018. This growth has been complemented by a strong emergence in the US and International markets.

Renowned for their quality finishes and luxury design CAMILLA AND MARC opened their first boutique in Paddington's intersection in 2009. In 2014, they welcomed their second store in Fiveways and the Mosman boutique on Sydney's lower north shore in December 2015. Following on from this momentum, the brand opened Emporium in Melbourne's CBD in July 2016, joining their Armadale store in Melbourne's inner city suburbs. The Strand boutique in Sydney's CBD opened its doors in April 2017. Further in 2017, the Rosebery outlet was opened and 2018 has seen the opening of their first boutique in Western Australia at Perth's Claremont Quarter.

With a strong following by international industry forerunners such as US InStyle Editor Laura Brown and stylist Vanessa Traina, the brand's local awareness in the US has developed exponentially. In May 2018, CAMILLA AND MARC opened MBFWA to coincide with the label's 15th anniversary. The show garnered international attention and was widely well received as a triumphant celebration of their 15 years in the business. 60 tonnes of sand were used to create a Dystopian Australian landscape, exploring themes of futurism, reflection and light within the collection.

In 2021, the Armadale brand store was refurbished and redesigned to focus on creating a more intimate setting, featuring an earthy palette and strong geometric shapes.

International following
UK newspaper The Observer described CAMILLA AND MARC as a brand to watch in July 2013. The brand has been exporting since its second season. International stockists include Saks Fifth Avenue, Net-a-Porter and Intermix, New York.
High-profile wearers of the brand have included Kate Bosworth, Kirsten Dunst, Rose Byrne and Kristen Stewart.

Clothing designed by CAMILLA AND MARC

References

External links

Official Website
HERI-M Website
Teendoo Website

Australian fashion
Clothing brands of Australia
Retail companies of Australia
Companies based in Sydney
High fashion brands
Design companies established in 2003
Retail companies established in 2003
2003 establishments in Australia
Australian brands